

PSR B1509−58 is a pulsar approximately 17,000 light-years away in the constellation of Circinus discovered by the Einstein X-Ray Observatory in 1982. It appears approximately 1,700 years old, and it sits in a nebula that spans about 150 light years. NASA described the star as "a rapidly spinning neutron star which is spewing energy out into the space around it to create complex and intriguing structures, including one that resembles a large cosmic hand." It is also known by the name "Hand of God". The spin rate is "almost 7 times per second".

X-rays from Chandra are red, green, and blue/max.

Gallery

See also
Pulsar planet

References

External links
Science Daily
Chandra X-ray Observatory blog

17
Optical pulsars
Circinus (constellation)
Articles containing video clips